Karkin may refer to:
 Karkin people, an indigenous ethnic group of California
 Karkin language, the extinct language of the Karkin people
 , a branch of the Oghuz Turks
 Karkin, Afghanistan, a town in Afghanistan

See also 
 Carkin

Language and nationality disambiguation pages